This is a list of electoral results for the electoral district of Hamilton in Queensland state elections.

Members for Hamilton

Election results

Elections in the 1940s

Elections in the 1930s

 Preferences were not distributed.

References

Queensland state electoral results by district